Sekola Waqanidrola (born 18 March 1998) is a Fijian footballer who plays as a defender for Rewa FC and the Fiji women's national team. She is the sister of Naomi Waqanidrola.

Waqanidrola is from Serua and started playing football at high school.

She was selected for the Fiji team for the 2018 OFC Women's Nations Cup. She also represented Fiji at the 2019 Pacific Games in Apia.

References

1998 births
Living people
Women's association football defenders
Fijian women's footballers
Fiji women's international footballers